Ana Destéfano (born 23 May 1981) is an Argentine former gymnast. She competed at the 1996 Summer Olympics.

References

External links
 

1981 births
Living people
Argentine female artistic gymnasts
Olympic gymnasts of Argentina
Gymnasts at the 1996 Summer Olympics
Place of birth missing (living people)
Gymnasts at the 1995 Pan American Games
Pan American Games bronze medalists for Argentina
Pan American Games medalists in gymnastics
Medalists at the 1995 Pan American Games
20th-century Argentine women
21st-century Argentine women